George Bryson (December 13, 1813 – January 13, 1900) was a Scottish-born businessman and political figure in Quebec.

He was born in Paisley, the son of James Bryson and Jane Cochrane, and came to Upper Canada with his parents in 1821. In 1835, he moved to the area near Fort-Coulonge in Lower Canada, where he entered the timber trade. In 1845, he married Robina Cobb. Bryson was mayor of Mansfield-et-Pontefract from 1855 to 1857 and from 1862 to 1867. He also served as justice of the peace, postmaster for Fort Coulonge and warden for Pontiac County. In 1857, he was elected to represent Pontiac in the Legislative Assembly of the Province of Canada  in a by-election held after the death of John Egan, but the assembly was dissolved before he took his seat. Bryson was defeated in the general election that followed in 1858. In 1867, he was named to the province's Legislative Council for Inkerman division. He helped establish the Bank of Ottawa, later serving as a director, and promoted the development of railway links in the region. Bryson retired from politics in 1887 and died in Fort-Coulonge at the age of 86.

His brother Thomas was elected to the legislative assembly. Bryson's son John served in the House of Commons and his son George also served in the province's Legislative Council.

References 

1813 births
1900 deaths
Members of the Legislative Assembly of the Province of Canada from Canada East
Conservative Party of Quebec MLCs
Mayors of places in Quebec
Scottish emigrants to pre-Confederation Quebec
Immigrants to Upper Canada
Immigrants to Lower Canada
Scottish emigrants to pre-Confederation Ontario
Canadian justices of the peace